Amboy is a ghost town in Walton Township, Rooks County, Kansas, United States.

History
Amboy was issued a post office in 1882. The post office was discontinued in 1894.  There is nothing left of Amboy.

References

Former populated places in Rooks County, Kansas
Former populated places in Kansas
1882 establishments in Kansas
Populated places established in 1882